Novoye is a rural locality (a selo) in Ivanovskoye Rural Settlement, Kovrovsky District, Vladimir Oblast, Russia. The population was 6 as of 2010.

Geography 
Novoye is located 39 km southeast of Kovrov (the district's administrative centre) by road. Shchibrovo is the nearest rural locality.

References 

Rural localities in Kovrovsky District